Barrackpore (also known as  Barrackpur) is a city and a municipality of North 24 Parganas district in the Indian state of West Bengal. It is a part of the area covered by Kolkata Metropolitan Development Authority (KMDA). It is the headquarters of the Barrackpore subdivision.

Etymology
The name Barrackpore may have originated from the English word barracks, as it was the site of the first cantonment of the British East India Company. Alternatively, the Ain-i-Akbari suggests that the name comes from "Barbakpur". Manasa Vijay, written by Bipradas Pipilai, refers to Talpukur (a place in Barrackpore) as "Charnak".

History 
The earliest references to the Barrackpore region are found in the writings of the Greek navigators, geographers, chronicles and historians of the 1st century BC to the 3rd century AD. These authors generally referred to the country of a people variously called the Gangaridai (also Gangaridae or Gandaritai). By the 15th and 16th centuries, Chanak and the other towns in the region had become populous river towns. The Statistical Account of Bengal by W.W.Hunter mentions the towns and villages of this subdivision on the banks of the Hooghly river as chief trading and marketing centres: "On The Hugli- Calcutta, the chief seat of commerce in India. Baranagar, Dakhineswar, Agarpara, Panihati, Sukchar- Khardah, Barrackpur, Nawabganj, Ichapore, Shyam Nagar, Naihati and Halisahar contain large bazaars for sale of miscellaneous goods."

Under the Mughal Empire, Bengal was divided into Circars, or administrative subunits, each of which was ruled over by a Mahal. The name "Barbuckpur", another name for Barrackpore, is associated with a Mahal in the Ain-e-Akbari. From the 17th century, the area was ruled over by a line of Zamindars based in Nona Chandanpukur, Barrackpore.

The first British barrack or cantonment in India was built in the town in 1772. After the British crown assumed direct control of India, the sprawling Government House and the Government Estate were built in Barrackpore to provide the viceroy with a suburban residence  outside of Calcutta.

Two rebellions against British authority took place in Barrackpore in the 19th century. The first of these was Barrackpore Mutiny of 1824, led by Sepoy Bindee Tiwary. In this rebellion, 47th Bengal Native Infantry refused to board boats to cross the sea for various reasons including social taboo "kala pani" to Burma in the First Anglo-Burmese War. The mutiny was suppressed by loyal Indian sepoys under the command of their British officers. In 1857, Barrackpore was the scene of an incident that some credit with starting the Indian Rebellion of 1857: an Indian soldier, Mangal Pandey, attacked his British commander, and was subsequently court-martialed. His regiment was disbanded, an action which offended a number of sepoys and is considered to have contributed to the anger that fuelled the rebellion. In order to commemorate his actions, a park named 'Sahid Mangal Pandey Udyan' was opened in the serenity of river Hoogly. The Army cantonment of Barrackpore also houses another significant historical landscape called the RCTC area, now populated by the defence quarters.

Geography

Barrackpore is bounded by North Barrackpur and Jaffarpur on the north, Mohanpur, Chak Kanthalia, Ruiya and Patulia on the east, Titagarh on the south, and the Hooghly and Barrackpur Cantonment on the west.

Background
Historically, the town was a military and administrative center under British rule and was the scene of several acts of rebellion against Britain during the 19th century. The oldest cantonment in India and the Police Training Academy in West Bengal are both located in Barrackpore. Barrackpore is also the seat for the Sub-Divisional Court of North 24 Parganas District in West Bengal.

Location
96% of the population of Barrackpore subdivision (presented in the maps alongside) live in urban areas. In 2011, it had a density of population of 10,967 per km2. The subdivision has 16 municipalities and 24 census towns.

For most of the cities/ towns information regarding density of population is available in the Infobox. Population data is not available for neighbourhoods. It is available for the entire Municipal area and thereafter ward-wise.

All places marked on the map are linked in the full-screen map.

Barrackpore is bounded by North Barrackpur and Jafarpur on the north, Mohanpur, Chak Kanthalia, Ruiya and Patulia on the east, Titagarh on the south, and the Hooghly and Barrackpur Cantonment on the west.

Police station
Barrackpore and Titagarh police station under Barrackpore Police Commissionerate has jurisdiction over Barrackpore Municipal area.

Post Offices
Barrackpore Head Post Office is one of the two  Head Post Offices of Barrackpore Division (formerly known as North Presidency Division) of North 24 Parganas district . It is a delivery post office, with PIN 700120. Other post offices with the same PIN are Monirampur, Nayapally, Orderly Bazar, Vivekananda Math, Barrackpore Bazar, Barrackpore Government Housing and Ghoshpara Road.

Sewli Telenipara is a delivery branch post office, with PIN 700121 in the Barrackpore Division of North 24 Parganas district. Other post offices with the same PIN are Nilganj Bazaar Sub Post Office, Beraberia BO and Suryapur BO.

Anandapuri is a non-delivery sub post office, with PIN 700122 in the Barrackpore Division of North 24 Parganas district. Other post offices having the same PIN are Nonachandanpukur (delivery office) and Jafarpur.

Barrackpore RS is a non-delivery sub post office, with PIN 700123 in the Barrackpore Division of North 24 Parganas district. Other post offices having the same PIN are Panpara and Talpukur (delivery office).

Demographics

Population

As per the 2011 Census of India, Barrackpore had a total population of 152,783, of which 78,349 (51%) were males and 74,434 (49%) were females. Population below 6 years was 11,786. The total number of literates in Barrackpore was 125,144 (88.76% of the population over 6 years).

, Barrackpore had a population of 144,331. Men constitute 53% of the population and women 47%. Barrackpore has an average literacy rate of 81%, higher than the national average of 59.5%. 8% of the population is under 6 years of age.

The majority of the population is Bengali and Hindu.

Kolkata Urban Agglomeration
The following Municipalities, Census Towns and other locations in Barrackpore subdivision were part of Kolkata Urban Agglomeration in the 2011 census: Kanchrapara (M), Jetia (CT), Halisahar (M), Balibhara (CT), Naihati (M), Bhatpara (M), Kaugachhi (CT), Garshyamnagar (CT), Garulia (M), Ichhapur Defence Estate (CT), North Barrackpur (M), Barrackpur Cantonment (CB), Barrackpore (M), Jafarpur (CT), Ruiya (CT), Titagarh (M), Khardaha (M), Bandipur (CT), Panihati (M), Muragachha (CT) New Barrackpore (M), Chandpur (CT), Talbandha (CT), Patulia (CT), Kamarhati (M), Baranagar (M), South Dumdum (M), North Dumdum (M), Dum Dum (M), Noapara (CT), Babanpur (CT), Teghari (CT), Nanna (OG), Chakla (OG), Srotribati (OG) and Panpur (OG).

Infrastructure
Amongst the civic amenities it had 172.63 km of roads and open drains. Amongst the medical facilities It had 40 medicine shops. Amongst the educational facilities It had 62 primary schools, 12 middle schools, 1 secondary school, 11 senior secondary schools and 3 non-formal education centres. Amongst the social, recreational and cultural facilities it had 1 old age home, 6 auditorium/ community halls, 2 public libraries and 6 reading rooms. Amongst the commodities manufactured were cottage industry and confectionery items. It had 11 bank branches.

See also Cities and towns in Barrackpore subdivision

Transport

Road

Barrackpore Trunk Road (B.T. Road) (part of both SH 1 and SH 2) connects Barrackpore Chiria More with Syambazar. Ghoshpara Road connects Barrackpore railway station area with Kanchrapara and goes on to link with the adjacent district of Nadia. Surendranath Banerjee Road connects Manirampore with Barrackpore railway station area via Barrackpore Chiria More. Barrackpore-Barasat Road (part of SH 2) starts at Lalkuthi and goes up to Barasat via Nilganj. Many buses ply along these roads. Barrackpore Rail Overbridge was opened in 2013 at Lalkuthi to make transport-communication easier and smoother.

Bus routes 
78 Esplanade — Barrackpore
81 Barasat — Fishery Gate
81/1 Barasat — Rajchandrapur
85 Kanchrapara — Barrackpore Court
MM5 Habra — Barrackpore Court

WBTC Routes

CSTC Bus
S11 Esplanade - Nilgunge Depot
S32 Howrah Station — Barrackpore Dhobi Ghat
S34B Barasat State University — Barrackpore Dhobi Ghat
S34C Nagerbazar - Barasat State University
E32 Howrah Station - Nilgunge Depot
AC20 Santragachi - Barrackpore Dhobi Ghat

CTC Bus
C28 Howrah Station - Barrackpore Dhobi Ghat
C29 Barasat - Barrackpore Mistry Ghat
C50 Howrah Station - Shyamnagar
C51 Naihati — Nabanna
D24 Barrackpore — Jagulia
D25 Barrackpore - Ranaghat
D27 Naihati - Jadavpur
E59 Naihati - Digha

Bus Routes without Numbers
Barasat - Kamalpur
Naihati - Egra
Salap - Barrackpore
Howrah Station - Barrackpore
 Dhulagarh- Barrackpore

SBSTC Routes
Haldia - Barrackpore
Naihati - Digha
Kanchrapara - Digha
Barrackpore - Durgapur
Kalyani - Digha
Barrackpore - Digha

Railways

Barrackpore has been serviced by rail since 1862. It takes about 35–40 minutes by suburban train to reach Barrackpore railway station from Sealdah Station. The Sealdah-Ranaghat Line runs through this city and connects to Howrah, Bandel, Burdwan, Kalyani and Ranaghat. It is part of the Kolkata Suburban Railway system. Former Rail Minister Mamata Banerjee announced the extension of Metro Rail project to Barrackpore (Kolkata Metro Line 5) which was later shelved infinitely. The Barrackpore Racecourse railway station was constructed in 1927 for race special train. This railway station is now abandoned and used by the Indian army only.

Ferry
There are three Ferry ghats in Barrackpore. Barrackpore Ferry Ghat links to Jugal Adhya Ferry Ghat across the Hooghly River in Serampore. Babaji Ghat at Monirampore links to Chatra Char Poisar Ghat at Serampore and Dui Poisar Ghat links to Sheoraphuli Ghat.

Air
Barrackpore Air Force Station is an Indian Air Force base located at Barrackpore. It is one of the oldest stations in the IAF, operating transport units. One of the Mi-17 squadrons is based here. Netaji Subhash Chandra Bose International Airport in Dum Dum, Kolkata is the nearest airport.

Education 

Notable schools include in Barrackpore include Ramakrishna Vivekananda Mission  , St. Claret School, Barrackpore Government High School, Kendriya Vidyalaya, Adamas International School, Douglas Memorial Higher Secondary School, Army Public School and Naba Nalanda School. Among the colleges located in Barrackpore are Barrackpore Rastraguru Surendranath College and Mahadevananda Mahavidyalaya. The area also has two engineering colleges, St. Mary's Technical Campus Kolkata being affiliated to AICTE.

Healthcare

Medical facilities available in Barrackpore are B.N. Bose Subdivisional Hospital (with 200 beds), Barrackpore Cantonment Hospital (with 48 beds), Barrackpore Police Case Hospital (with 6 beds) and Police Brigade Hospital (with 120 beds). Amongst the private medical facilities are Barrackpore Multispeciality Hospital, Sarada Seva Sadan, Panacea Nursing Home, Nehru Memorial Techno Global Hospital, Barrackpore City Hospital, Barrackpore Medical Research Center, Disha Eye Hospital and Disha Cataract and Refractive Surgi Centre, Prova Eye Foundation.

See also
 Barrackpore I CD Block
 Barrackpore II CD Block
 Barrackpore, Trinidad and Tobago
 Barrackpore Mutiny of 1824
 Mangal Pandey#Indian Rebellion of 1857

References

External links

Cities and towns in North 24 Parganas district
Neighbourhoods in Kolkata
Kolkata Metropolitan Area
 
Cities in West Bengal